The 1916–17 Montreal Canadiens season was the team's eighth season and eighth and last season of the National Hockey Association (NHA). The Canadiens entered the season as league and Stanley Cup champions. The Canadiens qualified for the playoffs by winning the first half of the season. The Canadiens then won the league playoff to win their second league championship, but lost in the Stanley Cup final series to Seattle.

Regular season

Harold McNamara, who had played for Cobalt in the Canadiens' first game in 1910, joined the Canadiens for this season. He would be released after the first two games and he would retire afterwards.

Final standings

Schedule and results
First half

Second half

Playoffs

Stanley Cup Finals

The games of the Cup finals were played at the Seattle Ice Arena. Games 1 and 3 were played under PCHA rules; Games 2 and 4 were played under NHA rules. In game one, Didier Pitre scored 4 goals as he led the Canadiens to an 8–4 victory. But the Mets won the next three contests to clinch the Cup, allowing only one goal in each game.

References

See also
 1916–17 NHA season
 List of Stanley Cup champions

Montreal Canadiens seasons
Mont
Mon